The American Collegiate Hockey Association (ACHA) is a college ice hockey association. The ACHA's purpose is to be an organization of collegiate affiliated non-varsity programs, which provides structure, regulates operations, and promotes quality in collegiate ice hockey. The ACHA currently has three men's and two women's divisions and includes approximately 450 teams from across the United States. Teams offer few athletic scholarships and typically receive far less university funding. The ACHA offers an opportunity for college hockey programs that struggle with large budgets and Title IX issues, as an alternative to the National Collegiate Athletic Association (NCAA) financial structure.

Policies and regulation

The interest in college hockey has grown as the game of hockey has grown in the United States. But as aggressively as the sport has grown at the grass-roots level, the number of NCAA programs has not expanded as rapidly to meet the demand as these youth players reach college and look to extend their hockey-playing experience. This is why the ACHA level was created.

The ACHA's primary mission is to support the growth of two-year and four-year collegiate hockey programs nationwide. The ACHA identifies standards that serve to unite and regulate teams at the collegiate level. The ACHA emphasizes academic performance, institutional sanction, eligibility criteria, and standards of play and opportunities for national competition, and the ACHA promotes all aspects of collegiate hockey stressing the personal development of individual athletes as well as national recognition for member organizations. In order to do this, the ACHA has developed organizational by-laws and a Policies and Procedures Manual to provide the policy foundation for the organization as it works to fulfill its purpose. These documents are reviewed yearly at the ACHA's annual meeting.

The ACHA's policies cover team and player eligibility, rules of play, ranking procedures, national tournament procedures, and other administrative issues, although the ACHA parallels the NCAA Division III with most eligibility requirements, recruitment processes, gameplay rules, etc. The league holds its annual meeting in conjunction with the annual convention of the American Hockey Coaches Association, in the month of April in Naples, Florida.

ACHA history

The ACHA was established on April 20, 1991. Fifteen charter members met during the Chicago Showcase in Skokie, Illinois at the North Shore Hilton. These member teams had been playing college hockey for many years but wished to legitimize its play by standardizing some of its procedures.

The members that created the organization were Tom Keegan (ACHA), Al Murdoch (Iowa State), Joe Battista (Penn State), Jim Gilmore (Ohio), Ernie Ferrari (Stanford), Howard Jenks (California-Berkeley), Jeff Aikens (North Dakota State), Don Spencer (West Virginia), Jim Barry (Navy), Scott Fuller (Navy), Leo Golembiewski (Arizona), Ron Starr (DePaul), Cary Adams (PCHA), Jim Warden (PCHA) and Jack White (UCLA).

The inaugural year of the ACHA was the 1991–1992 season. The goal of the organization was to create an impartial governing body to monitor national tournaments, player eligibility, and general oversight. Over the years the ACHA quickly grew to over 150 teams in three men's divisions.

A Women's Division was added in 2000 with a second Women's division being added for the 2006–2007 season.

By the 2001–2002 season, marking their 10th anniversary, the ACHA had a total of 179 teams registered with 33 teams in Division I, 100 teams in Division II, 18 teams in Division III, and 20 teams in the Women's Division.

By the 2002–2003 season that number raised to over 250 teams, with Division III adding over 80 teams alone.

By the 2003–2004 season the number raised to 278 teams: 40 teams in D-I, 124 teams in D-II, 87 teams in D-III, and 27 teams in the Women's Division.

By the summer of 2007 ACHA membership had reached 360 teams (M1-54, M2-190, M3-139, W1-32, W2-8), that cover 48 of the 50 states.

During the summer of 2009 the University of Alaska Fairbanks established a Women's Division II team becoming the 49th state in the ACHA. Hawaii is currently the only state without an ACHA team.

Every year since 2003, the Men's Division I Showcase has been an event that features some of the top teams in the ACHA.

ACHA partners with Fasthockey.com to broadcast many of the league's games.

In 2017, the ACHA adopted a new hosting format for holding the annual National Championship Tournament for all Men's & Women's Divisions. Then ACHA Executive Director Michael Walley championed an idea to hold all of the ACHA's National Championship Tournaments in one major U.S. city, in partnership with that city's National Hockey League (NHL) team. The inaugural year saw the 2017 ACHA National Championship Tournament Festival held in Columbus, Ohio, in partnership with the NHL's Columbus Blue Jackets. Then ACHA Executive Director Michael Walley assumed the role of Tournament Director for the inaugural tournament, Andy Storz was placed in the role of National Tournament Manager-Game Day Hockey Operations/P.A. Announcer/Anthem Soloist, while Fasthockey.com handled broadcasting. In July 2017, after undergoing a nationwide search, Russ Slagle was selected by the ACHA's Board of Directors and appointed to fill the vacant staff position of ACHA National Tournament Director, and A.J. Boldan was placed in the role of National Tournament Manager-Broadcast Operations/Executive Producer in conjunction with the ACHA opting to engineer its own National Tournament broadcasts on a newly launched YouTube channel "ACHA National Championships".

Membership

The ACHA includes both Men's and Women's Divisions. The Men's side is made up of three Divisions: 1, 2, and 3. Division 3 was the last to be established in 1999. Each division has its own distinguishing set of guidelines which are explained below. The Women's side has two divisions. Division 1 began in 2000 and Division 2 is the most recent addition to the ACHA with its inception in 2006.

Despite most teams' non-varsity status, the caliber of ACHA play can be quite high, especially in Division 1. Many large universities that do not sponsor hockey at the NCAA varsity level have become powerhouses, such as Ohio University, Adrian College, and Lindenwood University. Additionally, several universities that do sponsor NCAA varsity hockey teams also field ACHA-affiliated teams. Of all non-varsity sports activities, the ACHA-affiliated hockey teams generally garner the most attention at their universities, such as Missouri State where it is the third-largest spectator sport. The same can be said for the Arizona and University of Georgia who draw the third-largest fan base behind football and basketball. 

All ACHA teams are members of USA Hockey and the American Hockey Coaches Association (AHCA).

Men's divisions
ACHA Men's Division 1 comprises 70 teams as of the 2019–2020 season.  Some of these teams also compete against NCAA Hockey D1 and D3 Schools throughout the pre-season in informal exhibition games. Nine conferences and Independent teams compete annually for the Murdoch Cup, which is awarded to the Men's ACHA Division 1 National Champion. Twenty teams compete in the National Tournament. These top-twenty teams are ranked/selected by way of computer rankings, and as determined by auto-berths from the seven regular-season Conference champions. At Nationals, teams ranked 1–12 all receive first-round byes, with teams ranked 13–20 matching up 20 vs 13 (etc.), for the rights to play in the second-round in pre-determined bracket slots. Since 2012, two teams (Penn State and Arizona State) have moved from ACHA to NCAA Division I. A third, Lindenwood moved up in 2022.

Conferences
Central States Collegiate Hockey League (CSCHL)
College Hockey Mid-America (CHMA)
Eastern Collegiate Hockey Association (ECHA)
Eastern States Collegiate Hockey League (ESCHL)
Great Lakes Collegiate Hockey League (GLCHL)
Midwest College Hockey (MCH)
Northeast Collegiate Hockey League (NECHL)
Western Collegiate Hockey League (WCHL)
Wolverine Hoosier Athletic Conference (WHAC)

ACHA Men's Division 2 is currently the largest division in the ACHA, it includes approximately 200 teams in 12 conferences and Independents. These teams are divided into four Regions (Central, Northeast, Southeast and West). A total of 16 teams qualify for the National Tournament, four from each region. Each month of the season a ranking of the top 15 teams in region is released. After the final ranking in February the top two seeds from each region earn an automatic berth into Nationals. Seeds 3–10 compete in their respective single-elimination Regional Tournaments, with the two teams who win both of their games also earning a Nationals berth. The National Tournament is a pool play format with the winners of each pool advancing to the semifinals. The semifinal match-ups are the winner of Pool A vs. Pool C and Pool B vs. Pool D.

Conferences
Atlantic Coast Collegiate Hockey League (ACCHL)
Big Mountain Hockey Conference (BMHC)
Colonial States College Hockey Conference (CSCHC) (The Colonial)
Mid-American Collegiate Hockey Association (MACHA)
Mid-Atlantic Collegiate Hockey Association (MACH)
Mountain West Collegiate Hockey League (MWCHL)
Northeast Collegiate Hockey Association (NECHA)
Northern Collegiate Hockey League (NCHL)
Pacific 8 Intercollegiate Hockey Conference (PAC-8)
Pacific Collegiate Hockey Association (PCHA)
Super East Collegiate Hockey League (SECHL)
Texas Collegiate Hockey Conference (TCHC)
Tri-State Collegiate Hockey League (TSCHL)
Western Collegiate Club Hockey Association (WCCHA)
West Coast Hockey Conference (WCHC)
ACHA Men's Division 3 consists of approximately 140 teams in nine conferences and Independents. These teams are also divided into four Regions (Atlantic, North, Pacific and South). A total of 16 teams qualify for the National Tournament in the same manner as Division 2. The National Tournament has also been conducted in the same manner as Division 2 since 2010. Before that it was single elimination and every team played four games. The one exception is the semifinals match-ups. The winner of Pool A plays the winner of Pool B and the winner of Pool C plays the winner of Pool D.

Conferences
Blue Ridge Hockey Conference (BRHC)
College Hockey East (CHE)
Indiana Collegiate Hockey Conference (ICHC)
Metropolitan Collegiate Hockey Conference (MCHC) (Contains Non-ACHA members)
Michigan Collegiate Hockey Conference (MCHC)
Mid-American Collegiate Hockey Association (MACHA)
Northeast Collegiate Hockey Association (NECHA)

Women's divisions

ACHA Women's Division 1 includes 25 teams for the 2019–20 season, with all but independent Wisconsin playing in one of the four WD1 conferences. Eight teams qualify for the national tournament each season: automatic bids are awarded to the playoff champions of the Central Collegiate Women's Hockey Association, the Western Women's Collegiate Hockey League and Women's Midwest College Hockey, with the remainder of the field filled out by the highest-placing teams from the last of a series of weekly computer rankings. At nationals, the eight teams are paired off by ranking (1 vs. 8, 2 vs. 7, etc.) for a best-of-three first round, with the winners of those series advancing to the semifinals.

Conferences
Central Collegiate Women's Hockey Association (CCWHA)
Eastern Collegiate Women's Hockey League (ECWHL)
Western Women's Collegiate Hockey League (WWCHL)
Women's Midwest College Hockey (WMCH)

ACHA Women's Division 2 includes 51 teams for the 2019–20 season, with a majority standing as a member of one of four conferences. All teams are sorted into the Northeast Region (13 teams), the Southeast Region (19 teams), or the West Region (19 teams). At the end of the year, the top four teams from each region in the final edition of a monthly computer ranking are invited to the ACHA National Tournament. The WD2 tournament differs from WD1 in that teams are divided into four pools and play a round robin, with the pool winners advancing to the semifinals.

Northeast Region Conference
Independent Women's Collegiate Hockey League (IWCHL)

Southeast Region Conferences
College Hockey East (CHE)
Delaware Valley Collegiate Hockey Conference (DVCHC)

West Region Conference
Central Collegiate Women's Hockey Association (CCWHA)
Note: The CCWHA includes both a Division 1 and a Division 2 conference, with separate groups of teams as members

International competition

Players are selected from only ACHA Men's D1 to represent USA Hockey in the Winter World University Games, an IIHF and FISU event. ACHA Men's D2 and D3 division created the Select Teams to offer opportunities for the other Men division's to experience International hockey and they are ACHA events.
 
The Division 2 & Division 3 Selects Teams alternate going over to Europe each year during the Holiday Break to play European teams. The players are chosen from a round robin tournament in the spring usually in Pennsylvania. The tournament pits each conference's elite players against each other.

Logos

The original ACHA logo was created by Dave Kammerdeiner of the West Virginia University Art Department under the direction of Don Spencer for a cost of $50.

In August 2003, the ACHA held an official contest to design a new logo, with the winning school receiving free registration for the 2003–2004 season. The University of Washington's Husky Hockey team won the contest, with former graphic-design intern Tom Eykemans designing the new version of the logo (as shown above).

Men's champions

Division 1

Division 2

Division 3

Women's champions

Division 1

Results by school and year

37 teams have appeared in the ACHA Tournament in at least one year starting with 2001 (the first year that the ACHA sponsored a women's division). The results for all years are shown in this table below.

The code in each cell represents the furthest the team made it in the respective tournament:
  Pool Round
  Quarterfinals
  Semifinals
  National Runner-Up
  National Champion

† Tournament canceled due to the COVID-19 pandemic. Number shown is the team's final regular season ranking/seeding.

Division 2

Results by school and year

37 teams have appeared in the ACHA Tournament in at least one year starting with 2007, the first year for Women's Division 2. The results for all years are shown in this table below, other than missing data for the third-place games from 2007 and 2009.

The code in each cell represents the furthest the team made it in the respective tournament:
  Pool Round
  Semifinals
  National Runner-Up
  National Champion

† Tournament canceled due to the COVID-19 pandemic. Number shown is the team's final regular season ranking/seeding.

Zoë M. Harris Award winners

The Zoë M. Harris Award is given to the player of the year in each ACHA women's division.

Notable players in professional leagues

Men

Women

See also
 British Columbia Intercollegiate Hockey League
 National Collegiate Hockey Association

References

External links
 

 
1991 establishments in the United States
Sports organizations established in 1991
College ice hockey in the United States
Ice hockey governing bodies in the United States